Qatar participated in the 2011 Asian Winter Games in Almaty and Astana, Kazakhstan, from January 30, 2011, to February 6, 2011. This was Qatar's debut at a major winter sporting event. Qatar was originally also scheduled to send a men's hockey team, but it later withdrew.

Speed skating

Qatar will send 4 speed skaters.

Men

References

Nations at the 2011 Asian Winter Games
Asian Winter Games
Qatar at the Asian Winter Games